Lophophora is a genus of spineless, button-like cacti. Its area range covers southern through northeastern and north-central Mexico to Querétaro in central Mexico. The species are extremely slow growing, sometimes taking up to thirty years to reach flowering age (at the size of about a golf ball, excluding the root) in the wild. Cultivated specimens grow considerably faster, usually taking between three and ten years to reach from seedling to mature flowering adult. The slow rate of reproduction and over-harvesting by collectors render the species under threat in the wild.

Taxonomy
Lophophora means "crest-bearing", referring to the tufts of trichomes that adorn each tubercle. Lophophora has been reported to have two species, L. diffusa and L. williamsii. Another three species have been proposed: L. fricii, L. koehresii, and L. alberto-vojtechii. Recent DNA sequencing studies (Butterworth et al. 2002) have shown that L. diffusa and L. williamsii indeed are distinct species. DNA evidence from the alleged species L. fricii and L. koehresii would allow for more accurate classification.

Species
, Plants of the World Online accepted four species:

Cultivation 
Lophophora species easily adapt to cultivation, requiring warm conditions and a free-draining substrate, and to be kept dry in winter.

References 

 Edward F. Anderson, The Cactus Family (Timber Press, 2001) , pp. 396–397
 Edward F. Anderson, Peyote: The Divine Cactus (University of Arizona Press; 2nd edition, 1996) 
 Lyman Benson, Cacti of the United States and Canada (Stanford University Press, 1983) , pp. 680–683
 John M. Coulter, Preliminary revision of the North American species of Cactus, Anhalonium, and Lophophora (Contributions from the U. S. National Herbarium 3(2), 1894)
 Rudolf Grym, Rod/Die Gattung Lophophora (Vydavateľstvo Igor Dráb, 1997)

External links 

 Habitat photos of Lophophora
 Notes on growing Lophophora
 Cultivars photos of Lophophora
 lophophora collection video

 
Cactoideae genera